Two Brains may refer to:

 Dr. Two-Brains, a character in WordGirl, a children's TV series
 David Willetts, a British politician

See also
 The Man with Two Brains, a 1983 comedy film starring Steve Martin